Aring may refer to:

Aring Bautista (born 1920s), a Filipino actress
Typhoon Aring (disambiguation)
The letter Å